The 2019–20 Turkish Airlines EuroLeague was the 20th season of the modern era of the EuroLeague and the 10th under the title sponsorship of the Turkish Airlines. Including the competition's previous incarnation as the FIBA Europe Champions Cup, this was the 63rd season of the premier basketball competition for European men's clubs. The season started on 3 October 2019 and played its last games on 6 March 2020 due to the COVID-19 pandemic.

On 12 March 2020, Euroleague Basketball temporarily suspended its competitions due to the COVID-19 pandemic. On 25 May, Euroleague Basketball cancelled its competitions due to the COVID-19 pandemic.

The Final Four would have been played in 22–24 May 2020 at the Lanxess Arena in Cologne, Germany. CSKA Moscow was the defending champion and as a consequence of the COVID-19 pandemic, Euroleague Basketball decided not to recognize any team as the champion for the season.

Format changes
On 5 July 2018, Euroleague Basketball agreed expand the competition to 18 teams, with the allocation of two-year wild cards to German Bayern Munich and French LDLC ASVEL.

Team allocation
A total of 18 teams from 10 countries participated in the 2019–20 EuroLeague.

Distribution
The following was the access list for this season.

Qualified teams
The labels in the parentheses show how each team qualified for the place of its starting round:
1st, 2nd, 3rd, etc.: League position after Playoffs
EC: EuroCup champion
WC: Wild card

Notes

Teams

Venues and locations

Personnel and sponsorship

Notes
1. Cultura del Esfuerzo is the motto of the club.

Managerial changes

Regular season

League table

Results

Attendances

Average home attendances

Top 10

Awards
All official awards of the 2019–20 EuroLeague.

MVP of the Round

Regular season

MVP of the Month

Statistics

Individual statistics

Rating

Source: EuroLeague

Points

Source: EuroLeague

Rebounds

Source: EuroLeague

Assists

Source: EuroLeague

Other statistics

Individual game highs

Team statistics

See also
2019–20 EuroCup Basketball
2019–20 Basketball Champions League
2019–20 FIBA Europe Cup

References

External links
Official website

 
EuroLeague seasons

EuroLeague